Štítina is a municipality and village in Opava District in the Moravian-Silesian Region of the Czech Republic. It has about 1,200 inhabitants.

Geography
The municipality is located in the Opava Hilly Land within the Silesian Lowlands.

History
The first written mention of Štítina is from 1282, when there was a fortress called Štítina with a settlement called Troubky. The original fortress built by the lords of Benešov was rebuilt into a moated renaissance castle in the second half of the 16th century. In the 18th century, the village began to be called Štítina. From 1837 Štítina was owned by the Teutonic Order. In 1785, the castle was turned into a brewery and in the 1980s, the tumbledown building was eventually demolished.

At the end of World War II, the village was badly damaged.

Notable people
Heliodor Píka (1897–1949), general executed by the Communists after a show trial

Gallery

References

External links

Villages in Opava District